This is a comprehensive listing of official releases by Chip (formerly Chipmunk), a British rapper. His debut studio album I Am Chipmunk was released on 12 October 2009, where it reached number 2 and 49 on the UK Albums Chart and Irish Albums Chart respectively. The album had surpassed platinum-level sales of 300,000 copies in early 2010 and as such was reissued under the name I Am Chipmunk: Platinum Edition on 2 May 2010.

To date, Chipmunk has released 14 singles, the second of which was "Beast" which featured Loick Essien. The promotional single was released on 8 December 2008 and peaked at number 181 in the UK. The first official single "Chip Diddy Chip" was released on 16 January 2009 and reached a peak of number 21 in the UK; marking the rapper's breakthrough. Second single "Diamond Rings" was released on 6 July 2009 and featured vocals from Emeli Sandé. The single peaked at number 6, marking Chipmunk's first Top 10 hit. "Oopsy Daisy" featured Dayo Olatunji was released on 4 October 2009 and topped the UK Singles Chart for a single week; marking Chipmunk's first number-one single. A further Top 10 hit came from "Look for Me" which featured Talay Riley; the single peaked at number 7 in the UK upon release on 28 December 2009. The album's reissued was preceded by "Until You Were Gone" which featured vocals from Dutch pop singer Esmée Denters which was released on 19 April 2010. The single peaked at number 3 in the UK, marking Chipmunk's fourth consecutive Top 10 single. The rapper released single "Flying High" on 12 November 2010 which acts as a promotional/warm up single for the second studio album supposedly named Transition. The lead single from the album, "Champion", features American singer Chris Brown.

Albums

Studio albums

Collaborative albums

Mixtapes

Extended plays

Singles

As lead artist

As featured artist

Other charted and certified songs

Guest appearances

Music videos

As lead artist

As featured artist

References

Discographies of British artists